Marcus Wallenberg may refer to:
Marcus Wallenberg (bishop) (1774–1833), Swedish bishop
Marcus Wallenberg, Sr. (1864–1943), Swedish lawyer and banker
Marcus Wallenberg, Jr. (1899–1982), Swedish banker and athlete
Marcus Wallenberg (born 1956), Swedish banker and industrialist